Gamyam is a 2008 Indian Telugu-language road film written and directed by Krish. The film stars Allari Naresh,  Sharwanand, and Kamalinee Mukherjee. 

Loosely inspired by  The Motorcycle Diaries (2004), the plot follows the quest of Abhiram (Sharwanand), a rich and arrogant man to seek his love, Janaki (Mukherjee). He is joined by Gaali Seenu (Naresh), a road-side thief in a journey that ultimately results in his self-discovery.

The film received four Nandi Awards, including Best Feature Film, and four Filmfare Awards South. It was remade in Tamil as Kadhalna Summa Illai (2009) with Ravi Krishna replacing Naresh, and it was remade in Kannada as Savaari (2009) and in Bengali as Dui Prithibi (2010).

Plot 
Janaki is an orphan who crosses many hardships in her life. She manages to finish her MBBS degree and become a doctor. She understands everyday hardships of the common man and wants to serve people as much as she can, so she works in a hospital and spends much of her earnings and time to charity. On the other hand, Abhiram was the only son and heir of the multimillionaire GK. He grows up amongst all the luxuries and finishes his education in London. He comes back to Hyderabad and spends much of his time in parties and with women. He sees Janaki and gets attracted to her. Abhi accepts a challenge with his friends that he would woo Janaki and get her to bed. He starts to grow a relation with Janaki and becomes attracted to her, but her lifestyle is unlike his. On Abhi's birthday party, Janaki learns of his bet and confronts him. He accepts that he was involved in a bet, but he truly loves her and wants to spend his life with her. She angrily leaves the party, and Abhi comes to drop her at her hostel. Their quarrel continues, and they meet with an accident where a woman dies and her son is orphaned. Janaki survives the accident, but Abhi meets with injuries. When he wakes up at the hospital, he is told that Janaki left for her orphanage. Abhi wants to meet her and ask for her apology. In the process, he meets a goodhearted motorbike thief named Gaali Seenu who accompanies him in his journey. The journey Abhi takes changes his life drastically: he is exposed to the hard realities of rural life and its simple joys. The landscapes and the people he meets take him through an emotional journey that alters his perceptions forever and aid in his journey to self-discovery. Abhi and Seenu are captured by naxalites, but manage to escape. However Seenu gets shot in the back in the crossfire while trying to save Abhi and escaping and dies from his injuries. Abhi cries but continues to find Janaki. He finds her in a railway station and tells her about Seenu's death and his journey. Feeling sad for Seenu's sacrifice and Abhi's depression, Janaki and Abhi reconcile.

Cast

 Allari Naresh as Gaali Seenu
 Sharwanand as Abhiram / Abhi
 Kamalinee Mukherjee as Janaki
 Brahmanandam as Pessimist
 Rao Ramesh as Naxalite Sheshu
 Vijayachander as Bala
 Hema as Saraswathi
 Giri Babu as Poorna 
 Abhishek as Abhi's friend
 M. S. Narayana
 L. B. Sriram
 Krish as Naxalite (guest role)

Production

Background 
Director Krish completed his graduate studies in the United States and returned to India with the sole intention of becoming a filmmaker. Because his parents were not supportive, he started an education consulting firm. Meanwhile, he worked as an assistant to Rasool, who directed Okariki Okaru. After a year and a half of success, Krish returned to his dream of making films. When travelling across the state of Maharashtra during research on a film topic, he connected with his vehicle driver. From here, he obtained the initial inspiration and wrote a story about two people with a different outlook towards life travelling together.

Initially, Krish wanted to make this story in Hindi. With Aaj Jeeyenge as the title, one of his ideas was to picturise the story starting in Delhi, travelling through Bihar and ending the film's climax in Chhattisgarh. On occasion, he met Nagaraju Gandham, a Nandi Award-winning theatre writer. With Gandham, Krish prepared the script. When the daughter of a popular producer of Telugu films approached him if he had any scripts for a small-budget film, he narrated the story which was now based in the state of Andhra Pradesh. To further tighten the loose ends in his script, Krish consulted with his family, friends and well-wishers in the film industry such as K. Raghavendra Rao, Gangaraju Gunnam and Sirivennela Sitaramasastri. After undergoing several modifications and changes, the eighth version of the script was decided to be the final one. Without commitment from any producer, he decided to produce the film. Eventually, his father Saibaba Jagarlamudi produced the film.

Themes and influences 
The primary theme of the film is self-discovery. Noting that the film is inspired from  The Motorcycle Diaries (2004), Sify wrote about the storyline: "A spoiled rich brat realizing the social responsibility by taking an unusual journey." Rediff.com's Aditya Vardhan also noted its similarities with The Motorcycle Diaries. He added, "Krish weaves his own story around the basic theme and takes us on a journey capturing the mood of the countryside."

Soundtrack
The Music Was Composed By E.S. Murthy, Anil.R and Released by Vel Records. The lyrics Written by Sirivennela Seetharama Sastry Were Praised for their Motivational Value.

Reception 
Rediff.com critic G P Aditya Vardhan gave  stars out of 5 and stated: "Krish [..] has a serious theme and blended it with the right mixture of comedy and very good performances." While praising Allari Naresh's performance, Vardhan compared his role to Jagapathi Babu's role in Anthahpuram (1998). "Allari Naresh has finally found his groove," he added. Idlebrain.com rated 3.25/5 also opined the same by writing, "There are similarities between Gaali Seenu character in Gamyam and Jagapati Babu's role in Anthahpuram."

Sify which rated 3/5, wrote: "Gamyam is a good cinema with a touch of artistic values. The film's strengths are writing and direction. New director Radhakrishna shows that offbeat movies can be made entertainingly. He deserves praise for his honest effort and superb writing."

Awards 
Filmfare Awards South
 Best Film - Saibabu Jagarlamudi
 Best Director - Krish
 Best Supporting Actor - Allari Naresh
 Best Lyrics- Sirivennela Sitaramasastri for "Enthavaraku"

Nandi Awards
 Best Film - Golden Nandi  - Saibabu Jagarlamudi
 Best Director - Krish
 Best Supporting Actor - Allari Naresh
 Best Lyrics - Sirivennela Sitaramasastri for "Enthavaraku"

Notes

References

External links
 

2008 films
2000s Telugu-language films
2000s drama road movies
Indian buddy films
Indian nonlinear narrative films
Indian drama road movies
Indian drama road movies
Telugu films remade in other languages
Films directed by Krish
2008 drama films